The canton of Saint-Dié-des-Vosges-2 is an administrative division of the Vosges department, in northeastern France. It was created at the French canton reorganisation which came into effect in March 2015. Its seat is in Saint-Dié-des-Vosges.

It consists of the following communes:

Ban-de-Laveline 
Bertrimoutier
Le Beulay
Coinches
Combrimont
La Croix-aux-Mines
Entre-deux-Eaux
Frapelle
Gemaingoutte
La Grande-Fosse
Lesseux
Lubine
Lusse
Mandray
Nayemont-les-Fosses 
Neuvillers-sur-Fave
Pair-et-Grandrupt
La Petite-Fosse
Provenchères-et-Colroy
Raves
Remomeix
Saint-Dié-des-Vosges (partly)
Sainte-Marguerite
Saint-Léonard
Saulcy-sur-Meurthe
Wisembach

References

Cantons of Vosges (department)